Stefan Luder (born 3 January 1967) is a former Swiss curler.

He played  second on the Swiss rink that won a silver medal at the 1988 Winter Olympics when curling was a demonstration sport. He was also a silver medallist at the 1994 European Curling Championships, and a two-time silver medallist at the Swiss Men's Curling Championship (1994, 2005), Swiss mixed champion curler (2008).

Teams

Men's

Mixed

References

External links

 Soudog's Curling History Site: Curling at the Olympics - 1988

Living people
1967 births
Swiss male curlers
Curlers at the 1988 Winter Olympics
Olympic curlers of Switzerland
Place of birth missing (living people)
20th-century Swiss people
21st-century Swiss people